China Eastern Airlines Flight 583 was a commercial passenger flight from Shanghai, China, to Los Angeles, United States, operated by China Eastern Airlines.

On April 6, 1993, the McDonnell-Douglas MD-11 operating the service was cruising above the Pacific Ocean at Mach 0.84  when a crew member accidentally deployed the slats near the Aleutian Islands. The plane then encountered severe oscillations and made an emergency landing at Shemya Air Force Base in Shemya, Semichi Islands, Alaska.

Of the 255 passengers and crew, 60 were hospitalized; two ultimately died. Of the cockpit crew, five received no injuries and three received serious injuries. Of the flight attendants, eight received no injuries and four received serious injuries. Of the surviving passengers, 84 received no injuries, 96 received minor injuries, and 53 received serious injuries. By April 24, 1993 all but three of the surviving passengers were discharged from the hospital.

Aftermath

The airframe was repaired and continued to operate for China Eastern until March 2005, when it was converted as a cargo freighter for China Cargo Airlines. In July 2010, it was redesignated as N951AR, later served for US-based Sky Lease Cargo, but was eventually scrapped in November 2016.

China Eastern still uses the flight number 583, although the flight now departs from nearby Shanghai Pudong International Airport using a Boeing 777.

References

Accidents and incidents involving the McDonnell Douglas MD-11
Airliner accidents and incidents in the United States
April 1993 events in Asia
Aviation accidents and incidents in the United States in 1993
583